A subset  of a topological space  is called a regular open set if it is equal to the interior of its closure; expressed symbolically, if  or, equivalently, if  where   and  denote, respectively, the interior, closure and boundary of 

Examples

A singleton  is a closed subset of  but not a regular closed set because its interior is the empty set  so that

Properties

Every regular open set is an open set and every regular closed set is a closed set.

Similarly, the union (but not necessarily the intersection) of two regular closed sets is a regular closed set.

See also

Notes

References

 Lynn Arthur Steen and J. Arthur Seebach, Jr., Counterexamples in Topology. Springer-Verlag, New York, 1978. Reprinted by Dover Publications, New York, 1995.  (Dover edition).
  

General topology